Welsch may refer to:

 Gottfried Welsch (1618–1690), German physician
 Heinrich Welsch (1888–1976), Saarlandic politician
 Henry Welsch (1921-1996), American football and baseball player and coach
 Howard Welsch (1898–1980), American film producer
 Jiří Welsch (born 1980), Czech basketball player
 Johannes Welsch (born 1960), German percussionist
 Kurt Welsch (1917–1981), German footballer
 Maximilian von Welsch (1671–1745), German architect
 Roger Welsch (born 1936), American author
 Samuel J. Welsch (1902–1990), American politician

See also
 Welsh (surname)

Surnames of German origin